Stumph is a surname of German origin, being an Americanized form of the German surname Stumpf, which originated as a topographic name for someone who lived on newly cleared land. Notable people with the surname include:

Patrick Stumph (born 1984), better known as Patrick Stump, American musician, singer, and songwriter
Stephanie Stumph (born 1984), German actress
Wolfgang Stumph (born 1946), German actor and cabaret artist

See also
Stumpf
Stump (surname)